Brian Martella (born 28 November 1951) is a former  Australian rules footballer who played with Geelong in the Victorian Football League (VFL).

He made his debut against Essendon on 1 May 1971, but had little opportunity to impress as he only came onto the ground in the last quarter as a replacement for Wayne Closter.

Notes

External links 

Living people
1951 births
Australian rules footballers from Victoria (Australia)
Geelong Football Club players